Methylpiperidinopyrazole (MPP) is a synthetic, nonsteroidal, and highly selective antagonist of ERα that is used in scientific research to study the function of this receptor. It has 200-fold selectivity for ERα over ERβ and 1000-fold selectivity for blocking ERα-mediated gene transcription relative to that of ERβ.

See also
 Glyceollin
 Propylpyrazoletriol (PPT)
 Diarylpropionitrile (DPN)
 Prinaberel (ERB-041)
 Liquiritigenin
 Menerba
 PHTPP
 (R,R)-Tetrahydrochrysene ((R,R)-THC)

References

Antiestrogens
1-Piperidinyl compounds
Phenol ethers
Phenols
Pyrazoles